The Singapore men's national water polo team is the representative for Singapore in international men's water polo.

Singapore won the gold medal in the 1954 Asian Games, beating favourite Japan, 4–2 in the finals. In the 1986 Asian Games, Singapore won the bronze medal on better goal difference comparing to the 4th placed team Iran.

At the Southeast Asian Games, Singapore has traditionally been the dominant team as they won 27 consecutive gold medals. The streak finally ended at the 2019 Southeast Asian Games when they ceded the title to Indonesia.

2019 head coach was Dejan Milakovic whereas team captain was Koh Jian Ying.

Results

Olympic Games
1956 — 10th place

References

Water polo
Men's national water polo teams
National water polo teams in Asia
National water polo teams by country